Langs Beach is a locality on the shore of Bream Bay in the Whangarei District and Northland Region of New Zealand. It is about 5 km southeast of Waipu Cove and 10 km northwest of Mangawhai Heads.

The locality and the adjacent McKenzie Cove are named for the settlers Duncan McKenzie and William Lang who bought blocks about 1856. Lang's family subsequently bought out McKenzie's, and their farm was sold in pieces from 1927 to 1990.

Langs Beach was called Northland's most expensive suburb in 2019.

Demographics
They are  part of the larger Waipu statistical area.

Langs Beach had a population of 132 at the 2018 New Zealand census, an increase of 30 people (29.4%) since the 2013 census, and an increase of 30 people (29.4%) since the 2006 census. There were 63 households, comprising 66 males and 63 females, giving a sex ratio of 1.05 males per female. The median age was 59.3 years (compared with 37.4 years nationally), with 6 people (4.5%) aged under 15 years, 15 (11.4%) aged 15 to 29, 66 (50.0%) aged 30 to 64, and 45 (34.1%) aged 65 or older.

Ethnicities were 90.9% European/Pākehā, 4.5% Māori, 2.3% Pacific peoples, 9.1% Asian, and 2.3% other ethnicities. People may identify with more than one ethnicity.

Although some people chose not to answer the census's question about religious affiliation, 45.5% had no religion, 50.0% were Christian and 2.3% had other religions.

Of those at least 15 years old, 39 (31.0%) people had a bachelor's or higher degree, and 6 (4.8%) people had no formal qualifications. The median income was $36,800, compared with $31,800 nationally. 30 people (23.8%) earned over $70,000 compared to 17.2% nationally. The employment status of those at least 15 was that 42 (33.3%) people were employed full-time, 27 (21.4%) were part-time, and 3 (2.4%) were unemployed.

References 

Whangarei District
Populated places in the Northland Region